Jean-Pierre Gattuso is a French ocean scientist conducting research globally, from the pole to the tropics and from nearshore to the open ocean. His research addresses the biology of reef-building corals, the biogeochemistry of coastal ecosystems, and the response of marine plants, animals and ecosystems to global environmental change. He is also interested in transdisciplinary research, collaborating with social scientists to address ocean-based solutions to minimize climate change and its impacts. He is currently a CNRS Research Professor at Sorbonne University.

Education
Gattuso earned a bachelor's degree from the University of Nice (1980) and a master's degree in oceanography at the University of Aix-Marseille II. In 1987, he obtained a Ph.D. in oceanography from the University of Aix-Marseille II.

Career
Upon receiving his Ph.D., Gattuso moved to Australia where he was a postdoctoral researcher at the Australian Institute of Marine Science(1988-1990). In 1990, Gattuso took a position of CNRS research scientist at Centre de Biologie et Écologie Tropicale et Méditerranéenne of the University of Perpignan(1990-1992). He then moved to the Scientific Center of Monaco to launch and lead the Ecophysiology and Biogeochemistry group. In 1998, Gattuso went back to a CNRS joint laboratory at the Villefranche Oceanographic Observatory and moved to the ranks of Research Professor (directeur de recherche). He is also Associate Scientist at the Institute for Sustainable Development and International Relations (IDDRI-SciencesPo, Paris). Gattuso has been visiting professor or scientist at Rutgers University, the National Center for Atmospheric Research and Shantou University.

Gattuso is the founding editor-in-chief of Biogeosciences  and served or has served in the editorial board of several scientific journals. He founded the Biogeosciences Division  of the European Geosciences Union, and has received multiple awards and honors for his research contributions. He led the launch of the Ocean Acidification International Coordination Centre  at the International Atomic Energy Agency, co-edited the first book on ocean acidification  (Oxford University Press) and contributed to several IPCC products (5th Assessment Report, Special Report on 1.5°C of Warming, and the Special Report on the Ocean and Cryosphere in a Changing Climate).

Research
Gattuso was originally trained as a marine biologist. He first investigated photoadaptation of reef-building corals.
He then looked at the cycling of carbon and carbonates in corals and coral reefs. These biogeochemical studies were expanded to temperate  and Arctic  coastal areas. Gattuso was an early investigator of the consequences of ocean acidification on marine organisms and ecosystems. He led the European Project on Ocean Acidification and is the lead developer of the R package seacarb (R package version 3.2.14.) His current research relates to the effects of ocean acidification and warming on marine ecosystems and the services that they provide to society. He also investigates ocean-based solutions to mitigate and adapt to climate change.

Awards and distinctions 
 2020, Ruth Patrick Award, Association for the Sciences of Limnology and Oceanography 
 2018, Elected member, Academia Europaea  
 2014, Blaise Pascal Medal in Earth and Environmental Sciences, and elected member of the European Academy of Sciences  
 2012, Vladimir Vernadsky Medal, European Geosciences Union    
 2005, Union Service Award, European Geosciences Union 
 2002, Outstanding reviewer, Limnology & Oceanography 
 2001, Oceanography medal, Société d’océanographie de France

Selected works 
The complete list of papers is available here. Here are a few key papers :
 
  
  
 
  
   
 Gattuso, J.-P.; Hansson, L.; "Ocean acidification" (Oxford University Press)

References 

French oceanographers
Côte d'Azur University alumni
University of the Mediterranean alumni
1958 births
Living people